The 2010 BDO Classic Canadian Open was the third Grand Slam of Curling tournament of the 2009-10 curling season. It was held January 20-24 at the MTS Centre in Winnipeg, Manitoba.

Teams

Draws

Playoffs

2010
2010 in Manitoba
2010 in Canadian curling
Curling competitions in Winnipeg
January 2010 sports events in Canada